Mount Alfred may refer to:

Mount Alfred, a mountain in Canada
Mount Alfred (New Zealand)
Mount Alfred (Antarctica)